Plectopylidae is a taxonomic family of large air-breathing land snails, terrestrial pulmonate gastropod mollusks in the superfamily Plectopyloidea.

Distribution
The range of the family Plectopylidae (Plectopylis Benson 1860 s. l.) extends from Nepal and Northeastern India through large part of Southeastern Asia (including the Malay Peninsula, Northern Thailand, Northern Vietnam, Central and Southern China) to Taiwan and Southern Japan. Up to now, the distribution of Plectopylidae is divided into two geographic regions: (1) Nepal, Northeastern India (Assam and Arunachal Pradesh), Myanmar, western Yunnan, western part of Thailand, Northern Malaysia and northwestern part of Laos, and (2) Northern Vietnam, Southern China (west of the Eastern Yunnan–Guizhou–Middle Sichuan line), Taiwan and the Ryukyu Islands.

Taxonomy
This family has two subfamilies:
 Plectopylinae Möllendorff, 1898
 Sinicolinae Páll-Gergely, 2018

Genera
Genera within the family Plectopylidae include:
 Plectopylinae Möllendorff, 1898
 Chersaecia Gude, 1899
 Hunyadiscus Páll-Gergely, 2016
 Naggsia Páll-Gergely & Muratov, 2016
 Plectopylis Benson, 1860 - the type genus of the family Plectopylidae
Sinicolinae Páll-Gergely, 2018
 Endothyrella Zilch, 1959
 Gudeodiscus Páll-Gergely, 2013
 subgenus Gudeodiscus Páll-Gergely, 2013
 subgenus Veludiscus Páll-Gergely, 2015
 Halongella Páll-Gergely, 2015
 † Plectopyloides Yen, 1969 - fossil genus from China
 Sicradiscus Páll-Gergely, 2013
 Sinicola Gude, 1899
Genera brought into synonymy
 Endoplon Gude, 1899: synonym of Chersaecia Gude, 1899 (junior synonym)
 Endothyra Gude, 1899: synonym of Endothyrella Zilch, 1960

Gerard Kalshoven Gude revised every known taxon of Plectopylis at the end of the 19th century, and he published drawings of their shells and armature (lamella complex). He subdivided Plectopylis into seven “sections”: Endothyra, Chersaecia, Endoplon, Plectopylis, Sinicola, Enteroplax Gude, 1899 and Sykesia Gude, 1897. Enteroplax was transferred to the family Strobilopsidae Wenz, 1915. Ruthvenia Gude, 1911 (replacement name for Sykesia which itself was a replacement name for Austenia Gude, 1897) was transferred to the family Endodontidae Pilsbry, 1895 or to the Charopidae Hutton, 1884. The name Endothyrella was established by Zilch (1960) to replace the generic name Endothyra Gude, 1899, that is a junior homonym of foraminiferan genus Endothyra Phillips, 1845. Genus Amphicoelina Haas, 1933 was classified within Plectopylidae before, but it was moved to Camaenidae in 2013.

Gude's diagnoses of his sections are based on the direction of the coiling of the shell, the depth of the umbilicus, and the morphology and direction of the palatal folds. Most of Gude's diagnoses are not mutually exclusive. Moreover, several species were misassigned by Gude, which was probably the result of focusing exclusively on the morphology of the parietal plicae. Most of plectopylid species were reviewed and some were reassigned by Barna Páll-Gergely and his colleagues in 2013-2016.

Overview of species
Species within the family Plectopylidae include:
 Chersaecia austeni (Gude, 1899)
 Chersaecia brachydiscus (Godwin-Austen, 1879)
 Chersaecia degerbolae (Solem, 1966)
 Chersaecia dextrorsa (Benson, 1860)
 Chersaecia kengtungensis (Gude, 1914)
 Chersaecia leiophis (Benson, 1860) - type species, synonym: Chersaecia pseudophis Godwin-Austen, 1875
 Chersaecia munipurensis (Godwin-Austen, 1875)
 Chersaecia muspratti (Gude, 1897)
 Chersaecia nagaensis (Godwin-Austen, 1875)
 Chersaecia perarcta (Blanford, 1865)
 Chersaecia perrierae (Gude, 1897)
 Chersaecia refuga (Gould, 1846)
 Chersaecia shanensis (Stoliczka, 1873)
 Chersaecia shiroiensis (Godwin-Austen, 1875)
 Chersaecia simplex (Solem, 1966)
 Endoplon brachyplecta (Benson, 1863) - type species
 Endoplon smithiana (Gude, 1896)
 Endothyrella aborensis (Gude, 1915)
 Endothyrella affinis (Gude, 1896)
 Endothyrella angulata Budha & Páll-Gergely, 2015
 Endothyrella babbagei (Gude, 1915)
 Endothyrella brahma (Godwin-Austen, 1879)
 Endothyrella bedfordi (Gude, 1915)
 Endothyrella blanda (Gude, 1897)
 Endothyrella dolakhaensis Budha & Páll-Gergely, 2015
 Endothyrella fultoni (Godwin-Austen, 1892)
 Endothyrella gregorsoni (Gude, 1915)
 Endothyrella inexpectata Páll-Gergely, 2015
 Endothyrella macromphalus (W. Blanford, 1870)
 Endothyrella minor (Godwin-Austen, 1879)
 Endothyrella miriensis (Gude, 1915)
 Endothyrella nepalica Budha & Páll-Gergely, 2015
 Endothyrella oakesi (Gude, 1915)
 Endothyrella oglei (Godwin-Austen, 1879) - synonym: Chersaecia oglei (Godwin-Austen, 1879)
 Endothyrella pinacis (Benson, 1859) - synonym: Endothyrella pettos (von Martens, 1868)
 Endothyrella plectostoma (Benson, 1836) - type species, subspecies: Endothyrella plectostoma prodigium (Benson); Endothyrella plectostoma exerta (Gude, 1901)
 Endothyrella robustistriata Páll-Gergely, 2015
 Endothyrella serica (Godwin-Austen, 1875) - synonym: Chersaecia serica (Godwin-Austen, 1875)
 Endothyrella sowerbyi (Gude, 1898)
 Endothyrella tricarinata (Gude, 1897)
 Endothyrella williamsoni (Gude, 1915)
 Gudeodiscus anceyi (Gude, 1901)
 Gudeodiscus concavus Páll-Gergely, 2013
 Gudeodiscus cyrtochilus (Gude, 1909)
 Gudeodiscus dautzenbergi (Gude, 1901) - synonym: Gudeodiscus persimilis (Gude, 1901)
 Gudeodiscus emigrans (Möllendorff, 1901) - subspecies: Gudeodiscus emigrans otanii Páll-Gergely & Hunyadi, 2013; Gudeodiscus emigrans quadrilamellatus Páll-Gergely, 2013
 Gudeodiscus eroessi Páll-Gergely & Hunyadi, 2013 - subspecies: Gudeodiscus eroessi fuscus Páll-Gergely & Hunyadi, 2013; Gudeodiscus eroessi hemisculptus Páll-Gergely, 2013
 Gudeodiscus fischeri (Gude, 1901) - synonym: Gudeodiscus tenuis (Gude, 1901)
 Gudeodiscus francoisi (H. Fischer, 1899) - synonyms: Gudeodiscus lepidus (Gude, 1900); Gudeodiscus bavayi (Gude, 1901)
 Gudeodiscus giardi (H. Fischer, 1898) - synonym: Gudeodiscus congestus (Gude, 1898); subspecies: Gudeodiscus giardi szekeresi Páll-Gergely & Hunyadi, 2013; Gudeodiscus giardi oharai Páll-Gergely, 2013
 Gudeodiscus goliath Páll-Gergely & Hunyadi, 2013
 Gudeodiscus hemmeni Páll-Gergely & Hunyadi, 2015
 Gudeodiscus infralevis (Gude, 1908) - synonym: Gudeodiscus soror (Gude, 1908)
 Gudeodiscus longiplica Páll-Gergely & Asami, 2016
 Gudeodiscus marmoreus Páll-Gergely, 2014
 Gudeodiscus messageri (Gude, 1909) - subspecies: Gudeodiscus messageri raheemi Páll-Gergely & Hunyadi, 2015
 Gudeodiscus multispira (Möllendorff, 1883)
 Gudeodiscus okuboi Páll-Gergely & Hunyadi, 2013
 Gudeodiscus phlyarius (Mabille, 1887) - type species, synonyms: Gudeodiscus moellendorffi (Gude, 1901); Gudeodiscus gouldingi (Gude, 1909); Gudeodiscus verecundus (Gude, 1909); Gudeodiscus fallax (Gude, 1909); Gudeodiscus anterides (Gude, 1909); Gudeodiscus phlyarius werneri Páll-Gergely, 2013
 Gudeodiscus pulvinaris (Gould, 1859) - subspecies: Gudeodiscus pulvinaris robustus Páll-Gergely & Hunyadi, 2013
 Gudeodiscus soosi Páll-Gergely, 2013
 Gudeodiscus suprafilaris (Gude, 1908)
 Gudeodiscus ursula Páll-Gergely & Hunyadi, 2013
 Gudeodiscus villedaryi (Ancey, 1888)
 Gudeodiscus yanghaoi Páll-Gergely & Hunyadi, 2013 
 Gudeodiscus yunnanensis Páll-Gergely, 2013
 Halongella fruhstorferi (Möllendorff, 1901) - synonym: Gudeodiscus fruhstorferi (Möllendorff, 1901)
 Halongella schlumbergeri (Morlet, 1886) - type species, synonym: Gudeodiscus schlumbergeri (Morlet, 1886); Gudeodiscus jovius (Mabille, 1887); Gudeodiscus hirsutus (Möllendorff, 1901); Gudeodiscus pilsbryana (Gude, 1901)
 Hunyadiscus andersoni (W. Blanford, 1869) - synonym: Chersaecia andersoni (W. Blanford, 1869) 
 Hunyadiscus saurini Páll-Gergely, 2016
 Naggsia laomontana (L. Pfeiffer, 1862) - synonym: Chersaecia laomontana (L. Pfeiffer, 1862)
 Plectopylis bensoni (Gude, 1914) - type species
 Plectopylis anguina (Gould, 1847)
 Plectopylis cairnsi (Gude, 1898)
 Plectopylis cyclaspis (Benson, 1859) - synonym: Plectopylis revoluta Pfeiffer, 1867
 Plectopylis feddeni (W. Blanford, 1865)
 Plectopylis karenorum (W. Blanford, 1865)
 Plectopylis goniobathmos (Ehrmann, 1922)
 Plectopylis leucochila (Gude, 1897)
 Plectopylis linterae (Möllendorff, 1897)
 Plectopylis lissochlamys (Gude, 1897)
 Plectopylis magna (Gude, 1897)
 Plectopylis ponsonbyi (Godwin-Austen, 1888)
 Plectopylis repercussa (Gould, 1856)
 Plectopylis woodthorpei (Gude, 1899)
 Sicradiscus cutisculptus (Möllendorff, 1882)
 Sicradiscus diptychia (Möllendorff, 1885)
 Sicradiscus feheri Páll-Gergely & Hunyadi, 2013
 Sicradiscus hirasei (Pilsbry, 1904)
 Sicradiscus invius (Heude, 1885)
 Sicradiscus ishizakii (Kuroda, 1941)
 Sicradiscus mansuyi (Gude, 1908)
 Sicradiscus schistoptychia (Möllendorff, 1886) - type species
 Sicradiscus securus (Heude, 1885)
 Sicradiscus transitus Páll-Gergely, 2013
 Sinicola asamiana Páll-Gergely, 2013
 Sinicola alphonsi (Deshayes, 1870)
 Sinicola biforis (Heude, 1885)
 Sinicola emoriens (Gredler, 1881)
 Sinicola fimbriosa (Martens, 1875) - type species
 Sinicola jugatoria (Ancey, 1885) - synonym: Sinicola laminifera (Möllendorff, 1885)
 Sinicola murata (Heude, 1885)
 Sinicola reserata (Heude, 1885) - subspecies: Sinicola reserata azona (Gredler, 1887); Sinicola reserata hensanensis (Yen, 1939)
 Sinicola schmackeri Páll-Gergely, 2013
 Sinicola stenochila (Möllendorff, 1885) - subspecies: Sinicola stenochila basilia (Gude, 1897)
 Sinicola stenomphala Páll-Gergely & Hunyadi, 2013
 Sinicola straeleni (Yen, 1937)
 Sinicola vallata (Heude, 1889)
 Sinicola vargabalinti Páll-Gergely, 2014

 Endothyrella hanleyi (Godwin-Austen, 1879) - nomen dubium

Fossil species:
 † Plectopyloides altus
 † Plectopyloides applanatus
 † Plectopyloides guanzhuangensis
 † Plectopyloides multispiralus
 † Plectopyloides regularus - type species of the genus Plectopyloides
 † Plectopyloides shantungensis Yen, 1969

Ecology
Plectopylid species seem to be associated with calcareous areas in Vietnam. Living specimens occur at the base of large limestone rocks surrounded by leaf litter and humus. Thus, they are not rock-dwelling but ground-dwelling. Most living species have reticulated sculpture on the dorsal shell side, which is often covered with soil and this may be of value in providing camouflage.

References
This article incorporates Creative Commons (CC-BY-4.0) text from the references

External links
 Barna Páll-Gergely, Systematic revision of the Plectopylinae (Gastropoda, Pulmonata, Plectopylidae); European Journal of Taxonomy 455: 1–114, 2018